Security Unlimited (Chinese: 摩登保鑣) is a 1981 Hong Kong comedy film directed by and starring Michael Hui and co-starring his brothers Samuel Hui and Ricky Hui, who are known as the Hui Brothers. Michael Hui was awarded Best Actor at the 1st Hong Kong Film Awards, making him the first ever recipient for the award.

Plot
Chow Sai-cheung (Michael Hui), a bitter supervisor of a Hong Kong private security company, teaches unusual guard tactics to new recruits such as electric mats, parachuting off burning buildings and counter-attacking gunfire. He was secretly observed by his new boss (Stanley Fung) and Sylvester (Arnis Hasi), unimpressed by his work, the new boss demotes Chow and promotes Chow's assistant Sam (Samuel Hui). Under the leadership of Sam, Chow and new recruit Bruce Tang (Ricky Hui) encounter a slew of misadventures, including pursuing stowaways on a party boat. Bruce ultimately falls in love with one of the stowaways. Finally, they all get entangled in a plot to steal one of China's most prized treasures on display in Hong Kong, and in a plot involving some missing government money that the security officers were guarding.

Cast

Box office
It also became the highest-grossing film of all-time in Singapore with a gross of S$1.4 million.

Accolades

Album

Security Unlimited is Samuel Hui's eighth Cantopop album with the title track being the film's theme song.

Track listing
"摩登保鑣"
"印象"
"扮野"
"笑下就算"
"長春不老"
"我的心仍屬於您"
"恭喜！恭喜！"
"人辦"
"陽光"
"甜蜜的往事"
"歌曲解困憂"
"我問"

References

External links

1981 films
1981 comedy films
Hong Kong slapstick comedy films
1980s Cantonese-language films
Films directed by Michael Hui
Golden Harvest films
Films set in Hong Kong
Films shot in Hong Kong
1980s Hong Kong films